Castle Manor Academy (formerly Castle Manor Business and Enterprise College) is a secondary phase converter academy school in Haverhill, Suffolk.

In 2019, the academy received an Ofsted inspection rating of 'good'.

Academy
In November 2017, the school joined the Samuel Ward Academy Trust. The move means that Castle Manor Academy, Burton End Primary Academy and Place Farm Primary Academy will become part of the Trust (Also known as SWAT).

External links
School Website

References
School Website

Secondary schools in Suffolk
Academies in Suffolk